Pionýr (- Czech, in English Pioneer) is a Czech-based voluntary, independent and nonpolitical movement of children, youth and adult people. It focuses on non-formal, educational activities and is organised during leisure time. Pionýr partially keeps an old tradition based on the Pioneer Movement, which was an international communist children's organisation in Central and Eastern Europe and still exists in some Communist countries. The Czech Pionýr is now associated to the International Falcon Movement - Socialist Education International, the movement works towards social democracy education for children around the world.

The term "Pionýr" expresses an idea of modern pioneering; the idea of searching and longing for socialist learning. Pioneer is internationally understood as a man - discoverer of new ways, directions and a herald of progressive ideas. Pionýr aims to fully comply with the meaning of this term.

In 2007, the organization decided to change its logo to a new one, based on the swallow emblem that already appeared in the logo used since 1990. It also includes the Czech tricolour, and is arranged in a globe shape.

Ideals of a Pionýr 
 Truthful – "A Pionýr protects the truth and keeps their given word."
 Hardworking – "A Pionýr works hard and learns well."
 Friendly – "A Pionýr is a friend of all children."
 Helping – "A Pionýr is brave, comradely, and helpful to others."
 Fair – "A Pionýr is honest and just."
 Nature Friendly – "A Pionýr protects nature and all life on earth."
 Patriotic – "A Pionýr loves their country."

See also
 Pionýr (Czechoslovakia)

External links
 http://www.pionyr.cz Official page of Pionýr (English version)

Pioneer movement
Youth organizations based in the Czech Republic
International Falcon Movement – Socialist Educational International